Eugen Uuemaa (14 July 1903 – 25 July 1941) was an Estonian athlete. He competed in the men's decathlon at the 1924 Summer Olympics. He was executed by the Soviets during World War II.

References

External links
 

1903 births
1941 deaths
Sportspeople from Tartu
People from the Governorate of Livonia
Athletes (track and field) at the 1924 Summer Olympics
Estonian decathletes
Olympic athletes of Estonia
Olympic decathletes
Estonian people executed by the Soviet Union
Estonian prisoners and detainees